Kazenny Bugor is a rural locality (a selo) in Altynzharsky Selsoviet of Volodarsky District, Astrakhan Oblast, Russia. The population was 161 as of 2010. There are 4 streets.

Geography 
Kazenny Bugor is located 30 km southeast of Volodarsky (the district's administrative centre) by road. Krutoye is the nearest rural locality.

References 

Rural localities in Volodarsky District, Astrakhan Oblast